The Following Morning is an album by German double bassist and composer Eberhard Weber recorded in 1976 and released on the ECM label.

Reception
The Allmusic review by Paul Collins awarded the album 3 stars, stating, "The absence of a drummer deprives The Following Morning of some of the drive and rhythmic shadings of other Weber releases. In some ways this is a more contemplative work, lingering longer upon the tones of the individual instruments... the album is quite subtle and slow to unfold. You might not pick up this album as often as some other Weber releases, but it can reward close listening".

Track listing
All compositions by Eberhard Weber.

 "T. on a White Horse" – 10:14 
 "Moana I" – 10:56 
 "The Following Morning" – 12:06 
 "Moana II" – 7:45

Personnel
Eberhard Weber – bass
Rainer Brüninghaus – piano, keyboards
Oslo Philharmonic Orchestra – cello, French horn, oboe

References

ECM Records albums
Eberhard Weber albums
1976 albums
Albums produced by Manfred Eicher